William Pilch may refer to:
 William Pilch (cricketer, born 1794), English cricketer
 William Pilch (cricketer, born 1820), his nephew, English cricketer